The 1926 South Dakota State Jackrabbits football team was an American football team that represented South Dakota State College in the North Central Conference (NCC) during the 1926 college football season. In its eighth season under head coach Charles A. West, the team compiled an 8–0–3 record, won the NCC championship, shut out seven of eleven opponents, and outscored all opponents by a total of 157 to 24.

Schedule

Roster
Sixteen players received varsity letters for their participation on the 1926 team:
 Howard Biegert, Montevideo, MN, quarterback
 Arnold Brevik, Gary, SD, guard
 Martin Carlisle, Brookings, SD, halfback
 Arthur Eggers, Wagner, SD, end
 Bob Ekem, Flandreau, SD, tackle
 George Frandsen, Plankinton, SD, quarterback
 Leslie Harding, Montevideo, MN, halfback
 John Johnson, Brookings, SD, end
 Frank Kelley, Tyndall, SD, halfback
 Harry Krug, Madison, SD, end
 Walter Parmeter, Westport, SD, fullback
 Louis Schugel, New Ulm, SD, tackle
 Leo Schweinfurt, Tracy, MN, fullback
 George Seeley, Rosholt, SD, guard
 Clyde Starbeck, Montevideo, MN, center
 Wolters, Watertown, SD, tackle

References

South Dakota State
South Dakota State Jackrabbits football seasons
South Dakota State Jackrabbits football
College football undefeated seasons